Couridjah is a small town in the Macarthur Region of New South Wales, Australia, in Wollondilly Shire. It was previously known officially as "Village of Couridjah".

History

The name "Couridjah" has been variously reported to mean, in a local Aboriginal language, anything from "The Place of the White Ants" to "The Home of the Medicine Man".

Couridjah was formerly a station on the Main Southern Railway. At the time of the line's construction, it was known as "Jones's Hut". That line was deviated in 1919 to a less steep alignment with easier grades, and the original line became the Picton-Mittagong Loop line. Thirlmere Lakes, to the west of the station, supplied water to the standpipes at Couridjah for replenishing steam locomotives, after their long haul up the steep grade from Picton.  The lakes were formerly known as the "Coridja Lagoons" and "Picton Lagoons". The sandstone pump-house is still in existence adjacent to the Lakes. The standpipes, too, remain near the station, but have been disused since 1964.

Heritage listings 
Couridjah has a number of heritage-listed sites, including:
 Main Southern railway: Couridjah railway station

Couridjah today
The platform and the small waiting room have been restored and are maintained by volunteers from the NSW Rail Museum at Thirlmere, though none of the Heritage trains which still use sections of the Picton Loop line stops there.

The station and platform were featured in a television advertisement for "Minties" lollies.

The main premises of the Tharawal Local Aboriginal Land Council are located at Couridjah. It is also the location of Picton Lakes Village, a settlement established in 1925 for sufferers of tuberculosis.

Couridjah has no shop, post office, or any other public building, nor any main street. It is chiefly a semi-rural residential area, among which are some small orchards and poultry farms.

References

Bibliography
 Chalk, Karyn. 20078. A brief history of Couridjah in the Wollondilly Shire of New South Wales Australia. New South Wales : Lulu. 
 Wright, Harry. "Picton Locomotive Depot and the Picton-Mittagong Loop Line", Roundhouse Vol. 41, No. 2, April, 2004. pp. 5–15

External links
 Minties confectionery ad. filmed at Couridjah Station in 1985
 Wollondilly Shire Council
 Wollondilly Shire towns and villages info

Towns in New South Wales
Wollondilly Shire